Belle Jennings Benchley (August 28, 1882 – December 17, 1973), known as “The Zoo Lady,” was the director of the San Diego Zoo from 1927 to 1953, guiding its expansion from a small collection of animals to an innovative, world-class zoo.

Personal
Belle Jennings was born in Larned, Kansas in 1882 and moved to San Diego with her family at the age of 5. They settled in the Roseville area of Point Loma, where the local elementary school was located in her parents’ home. She later attended Russ High School (now San Diego High School) and San Diego Normal School (now San Diego State University).

She married William L. Benchley in 1906; they had one child, a son, Edward. They divorced in 1922.

San Diego Zoo
After a stint as a school teacher, she was hired in October 1925 by Dr. Harry M. Wegeforth, the president of the Zoological Society of San Diego, to serve as bookkeeper for the San Diego Zoological Garden. In October 1927 she was promoted to the top position in the zoo, that of executive secretary, in which position she served until her retirement in December 1953. Her title was not changed to managing director until the year she retired. For most of her career she was the only woman zoo director in the world.

She and Dr. Wegeforth, as a team, oversaw the growth of the zoo through extensive animal collecting and innovative design. The Zoo was one of the first to put animals into naturalistic “cageless” exhibits. During her term as director, annual attendance increased more than fourfold, and the budget increased more than sevenfold. She ran the Zoo during two trying eras, the Great Depression and World War II while writing and editing the Zoo's monthly ZooNooz magazine and making hundreds of presentations to groups all over Southern California.

She served on committees of the American Zoological Association and was its first woman president; she was a member of the International Union of Directors of Zoological Gardens. She wrote several books, including My Life in a Man Made Jungle, the memoir My Animal Babies, and the children’s book Shirley Visits the Zoo.

Recognition
Upon her retirement in 1953, the mayor of San Diego proclaimed “Belle Benchley Day” and a retirement dinner was attended by more than 800 people.

In 2007 she was inducted into the San Diego County Women's Hall of Fame.

She was featured by the San Diego Union Tribune in their special 2021 section "Phenomenal Women: Executives and Entrepreneurs".

She died at the age of 90. She is buried in Greenwood Memorial Park in San Diego, where her gravestone features a carving of the head of a smiling gorilla drawn by her granddaughter, Laurel.

Bibliography
Benchley, Belle J., My Life in a Man-Made Jungle, Little Brown & Co., Boston, 1940
Benchley, Belle J., My Friends, the Apes, Little Brown & Co., Boston, 1942
Benchley, Belle J., My Animal Babies, Little Brown & Co., Boston, 1945
Benchley, Belle J., Shirley Visits the Zoo, Little Brown & Co., Boston, 1947
Poynter, Margaret, The Zoo Lady: Belle Benchley and the San Diego Zoo, Dillon Press, Minneapolis, 1980.

References

1882 births
1972 deaths
Balboa Park (San Diego)
Burials at Greenwood Memorial Park (San Diego)
History of San Diego
People from San Diego
San Diego State University alumni
Zoo directors
People from Larned, Kansas
San Diego High School alumni